Ross Robson is a Trials Division justice at the Supreme Court of Victoria. He is a graduate of both the undergraduate and graduate law programs at the University of Melbourne. He also earned a Master of Science from the London School of Economics.

References

Judges of the Supreme Court of Victoria
University of Melbourne alumni
Alumni of the London School of Economics
Living people
Year of birth missing (living people)